Helmuth Lehner (born 7 December 1968) is an Austrian musician, best known as the vocalist and guitarist of the extreme metal band Belphegor. Prior to Belphegor, he was in the heavy metal band Speed Limit, where he was known as Hel Lennart.

Equipment
Lehner is an avid user of Jackson Guitars. He has been seen using the RR24 and the DKMG.

Personal life
In 2011, Lehner contracted typhoid fever during their South American tour, which he believed he acquired the virus after accidentally drinking contaminated water from the sink. He eventually survived the infection and was able to recover after six weeks of rehabilitation. He stated that the event had inspired him in writing the album Conjuring the Dead.

In April 2016, Lehner was spat on by an Eastern Orthodox activist at an airport in Saint Petersburg, Russia.

Discography

 Speed Limit - Prophecy (EP, 1988, Breakin' Records)

References

1968 births
Living people
English-language singers from Austria
Austrian atheists
People from Korneuburg
Black metal musicians
Lead guitarists
Austrian male musicians